Amadocus (Gr. ) or Medocus was a common name among the ancient Thracians. It was also, according to Ptolemy, the name of a people and mountains in Thrace.

Amadocus I (died 390 BC), king of the Odrysae in Thrace in the 5th century BC
Amadocus II, Thracian ruler who inherited the kingdom of Cotys I in the 4th century BC
Amadocus, one of the princes of Thrace, who was defeated and taken prisoner by Philip V of Macedon in 184 BC
Amadocus, Hyperborean mentioned by Pausanias